Oscar R. Olson (March 24, 1869 – November 23, 1945) was a member of the Wisconsin State Senate from Blanchardville, Wisconsin.

Biography
Olson was born in Jordan, Wisconsin. he was the son of Rollin Olson (1832–1898) and Mary (Peterson) Olson (1837–1913), who immigrated from Norway in 1845. He attended Valparaiso University. During the Spanish–American War, Olson served in the Wisconsin National Guard, achieving the rank of captain. He died on November 23, 1945 and was buried in Old York Lutheran Cemetery in Green County, Wisconsin.

Political career
Olson was elected to the Senate in 1918. Previously, he served three terms as Green County, Wisconsin Register of Deeds. He was a Republican.

References

1869 births
1945 deaths
People from Jordan, Wisconsin
Republican Party Wisconsin state senators
Military personnel from Wisconsin
National Guard (United States) officers
American military personnel of the Spanish–American War
Valparaiso University alumni
American Lutherans
American people of Norwegian descent
Wisconsin National Guard personnel
People from Blanchardville, Wisconsin